CIKI-FM is a French-language Canadian radio station located in Rimouski, Quebec.

Owned and operated by Bell Media, it broadcasts on 98.7 MHz using a directional antenna with an average effective radiated power of 41,300 watts and a peak effective radiated power of 100,000 watts (class C). It also operates a relay, oddly named CIKI-FM-2 (since there is no station or relay with the call sign CIKI-FM-1), in Sainte-Marguerite-Marie, Quebec, near Amqui, on 93.9 MHz using an omnidirectional antenna with an effective radiated power of 750 watts (class A).

The station has a mainstream rock format and is part of the "Énergie" network which operates across Quebec. It received CRTC approval in 1986 to broadcast on 104.5 MHz, which was changed to its current frequency at 98.7 FM prior to the station signing on the air. It started operations as a sister station to CFLP (now CJOI-FM 102.9) in 1988.

CIKI initially became part of the Énergie network in 1989, but this affiliation ended in 2001 as then-owner Corus Entertainment ended its agreement with Astral Media (owner of the Énergie network). The station then adopted imaging similar to that of CKOI-FM in Montreal, until the station was, along with four other FM stations, transferred to Astral Media in exchange for six AM stations. Astral Media reintroduced the station in the Énergie network in June 2005, a few weeks after becoming the new owner. The station became part of the new NRJ network in August 2009, with the rest of the Énergie network of stations.

References

External links
 Énergie 98.7
 

Iki
Iki
Iki
Iki
Radio stations established in 1988
1988 establishments in Quebec